Abbasabad (also Romanized as ‘Abbāsābād) is a village in Gavdul-e Markazi Rural District, in the Central District of Malekan County, East Azerbaijan Province, Iran. At the 2006 census, its population was 750, in 179 families.

References 

Populated places in Malekan County